In idempotent analysis, the tropical semiring is a semiring of extended real numbers with the operations of minimum (or maximum) and addition replacing the usual ("classical") operations of addition and multiplication, respectively.

The tropical semiring has various applications (see tropical analysis), and forms the basis of tropical geometry. The name tropical is a reference to the Hungarian-born computer scientist Imre Simon, so named because he lived and worked in Brazil.

Definition 
 
 
The operations ⊕ and ⊗ are referred to as tropical addition and tropical multiplication respectively. The unit for ⊕ is +∞, and the unit for ⊗ is 0.

 
 
The unit for ⊕ is −∞, and the unit for ⊗ is 0.

The two semirings are isomorphic under negation , and generally one of these is chosen and referred to simply as the tropical semiring. Conventions differ between authors and subfields: some use the min convention, some use the max convention.

Tropical addition is idempotent, thus a tropical semiring is an example of an idempotent semiring.

Tropical exponentiation is defined in the usual way as iterated tropical products.

Valued fields 

The tropical semiring operations model how valuations behave under addition and multiplication in a valued field. A real-valued field  is a field equipped with a function
 
which satisfies the following properties for all ,  in :
  if and only if 
 
  with equality if 
Therefore the valuation v is almost a semiring homomorphism from K to the tropical semiring, except that the homomorphism property can fail when two elements with the same valuation are added together.

Some common valued fields:
 the field of formal Laurent series  (integer powers), or the field of Puiseux series , or the field of Hahn series, with valuation returning the smallest exponent of  appearing in the series.

References 

 

Semiring